The Ulriksdal dirt course was a course located 6 km north of Stockholm, Sweden at Ulriksdal. It hosted part of the cross-country portion of the eventing competition for the equestrian events at the 1956 Summer Olympics.

References
1956 Summer Olympics equestrian official report. p. 96.

Venues of the 1956 Summer Olympics
Olympic equestrian venues
Defunct sports venues in Sweden